Silvio Eduardo de Abreu (born 20 December 1942) is a Brazilian actor, director, and screenwriter. He is currently the director of the dramaturgy department of Rede Globo.

References

1942 births
People from São Paulo
Living people
Authors of Brazilian telenovelas
Brazilian male writers
Male television writers
Television show creators